Butler Township is one of fifteen townships in DeKalb County, Indiana. As of the 2010 census, its population was 1,691 and it contained 679 housing units.

History
Butler Township was founded in 1837.

The William Cornell Homestead was added to the National Register of Historic Places in 1973.

Geography
Holiday Lakes is in this township.

Unincorporated towns
 Butler Center
 Cedar
 New Era
 Saint Johns
(This list is based on USGS data and may include former settlements.)

Adjacent townships
 Keyser Township (north)
 Jackson Township (east)
 Cedar Creek Township, Allen County (southeast)
 Perry Township, Allen County (south)
 Eel River Township, Allen County (southwest)
 Swan Township, Noble County (west)

Major highways
  Interstate 69
  State Road 3
  State Road 205
  State Road 327

References
 
 United States Census Bureau cartographic boundary files

External links

Townships in DeKalb County, Indiana
Townships in Indiana
Populated places established in 1837
1837 establishments in Indiana